Liu Xiaoming (born September 1964) is a Chinese university administrator and politician, currently serving as deputy party secretary of Guangxi.

He is a representative of the 20th National Congress of the Chinese Communist Party and a member of the 20th Central Committee of the Chinese Communist Party.

Biography
Liu was born in Yangzhong County (now Yangzhong), Jiangsu, in September 1964. In 1985, he graduated from Southeast University majoring in road engineering before gaining a Master of Engineering degree from Beijing University of Technology in 1988.

Beginning in 1988, he assumed various posts at Beijing University of Technology, including assistant, instructor, associate professor, and full professor. He moved up the ranks to become assistant president in 1997 and vice president in April 2000. 

In March 2003, he became deputy director of Beijing Municipal Commission of Transportation, rising to director in February 2008.

He became director of the Department of Transportation Services, Ministry of Communications in March 2014, and rose to become vice minister in July 2016.

In March 2021, he was transferred to southwest China's Guangxi Zhuang Autonomous Region and appointed deputy party secretary.

References

1964 births
Living people
People from Yangzhong
Southeast University alumni
Beijing University of Technology alumni
People's Republic of China politicians from Jiangsu
Chinese Communist Party politicians from Jiangsu
Members of the 20th Central Committee of the Chinese Communist Party